Clandestinotrema is a genus of lichen-forming fungi in the family Graphidaceae. It has 17 species. They typically inhabit montane and cloud forest at higher elevations in the tropics.

Taxoomy

The genus was circumscribed in 2012 by Eimy Rivas Plata, Robert Lücking, and H. Thorsten Lumbsch, with Clandestinotrema clandestinum assigned as the type species. It contains species formerly classified in the genera Ocellularia and Thelotrema, and corresponds to the Ocellularia clandestina group as defined by Frisch in 2006. The genus name combines the species epithet of the type, clandestina, with the suffix -trema.

Molecular phylogenetic analysis strongly supports Clandestinotrema as a monophyletic clade, which can be distinguished from other taxa in its subfamily (Fissurinoideae) by its whitish thallus, which is often loosely corticate or ecorticate, and ocellularioid, usually , and often  ascomata. In this analysis, Clandestinotrema was divided into two sister clades. The first clade corresponds to species with narrow apothecial pores with an entire margin and finger-like columella, represented by the type species, C. clandestinum. The second clade corresponds to species with broadly open apothecia with a fissured margin and broad-stump-shaped columella, represented by C. leucomelaenum and C. stylothecium.

Description

The thallus of Clandestinotrema species can be white-grey to yellow-grey and have a smooth to uneven texture. It may or may not have a dense, prosoplectenchymatous cortex. The photobiont layer and medulla contain clusters of calcium oxalate crystals. The apothecia (a reproductive structure) can be immersed to erumpent and have a rounded to angular shape. The  of the apothecia is usually covered by a narrow pore and filled with brown-black, often white-pruinose columella. The margin can be entire to fissured-lobulate and is fused and brown-black. The columella is usually present and mostly carbonized. The  (sterile cells) are unbranched. The ascospores (spores produced inside the apothecia) usually have eight spores per ascus (sac-like structure), are 3-septate to muriform, and are ellipsoid with thick septa and diamond-shaped lumina. When young, the central septum becomes thickened before further septa appear, which makes them look Caloplaca-like. They are colorless and non-amyloid. This genus does not produce any lichen products or stictic acid.

Habitat and distribution

Unlike most other thelotremoid Graphidaceae, Clandestinotrema species primarily occur in high-altitude wet cloud forests with abundant bryophyte growth, making them ecologically distinct.

Species

In its original circumscription, Clandestinotrema contained 12 species. Several more have been added since.

 Clandestinotrema analorenae 
 Clandestinotrema antoninii 
 Clandestinotrema carbonera  – Venezuela
 Clandestinotrema cathomalizans 
 Clandestinotrema clandestinum 
 Clandestinotrema ecorticatum 
 Clandestinotrema erumpens 
 Clandestinotrema hepaticicola 
 Clandestinotrema leucomelanum 
 Clandestinotrema maculatum 
 Clandestinotrema melanotrematum 
 Clandestinotrema minutum  – Madagascar
 Clandestinotrema pauperius 
 Clandestinotrema portoricense  – Puerto Rico
 Clandestinotrema protoalbum 
 Clandestinotrema stylothecium 
 Clandestinotrema tenue

References

Graphidaceae
Lichen genera
Ostropales genera
Taxa described in 2012
Taxa named by Helge Thorsten Lumbsch
Taxa named by Robert Lücking